Kung Ming-hsin is a Taiwanese politician.

Early life
Kung obtained his bachelor's degree in statistics from Fu Jen Catholic University in 1986, master's degree in economics from National Taiwan University in 1989 and doctoral degree in economics from National Chung Hsing University in 1997.

Political career
Kung was the vice president of the Taiwan Institute of Economic Research while working with Tsai Ing-wen's incoming presidential administration. He was appointed in April 2016 to the Lin Chuan-led Executive Yuan as the deputy minister of National Development Council. Kung was named Deputy Minister of Economic Affairs on 8 September 2017. He served in that role through December 2018, after which he was appointed a minister without portfolio in charge of economic affairs.

References

Living people
Taiwanese Ministers of Economic Affairs
Year of birth missing (living people)
National Taiwan University alumni
National Taipei University alumni
Fu Jen Catholic University alumni